Several merchant ships have been named Emperor, or a variation of Emperor.
 Emperor (originally named Leopard), Canadian (later U.S.) schooner, U.S. Official No. 8500. Wrecked on Lake Ontario, near Oswego, New York, in November 1870.
 Emperor, British propeller, steam sloop. Wrecked at Fécamp, Pas-de-Calais, France on October 9, 1857.
 , Canadian propeller, steamer, bulk freighter, Official No. 126654. Wrecked on Isle Royale in Lake Superior on June 4, 1947.
  (originally named Canadian Warrior), Canadian propeller, package freighter, Official No. 140960. Wrecked at Ballantyne Cove, Cape George, Nova Scotia, on December 7, 1926.
  (originally Canadian Signaller, later Skjoldheim and Polyana), Canadian (later Norwegian) propeller, package freighter. Torpedoed by German submarine U-103 in the Atlantic Ocean on April 25, 1941.
  (originally Canadian Sower), Canadian (later Japanese) propeller, package freighter, Official No. 141487. Torpedoed by an American submarine near Po-hai on February 10, 1945.
  (originally Canadian Trader, later Gilda Scuderi), Canadian (later Italian and U.S.) propeller, package freighter, Official No. 141376. Lost in November 1928, while travelling from Seattle, Washington, to Kobe, Japan.
  (originally Canadian Adventurer, later Nootka), Canadian (later Peruvian) propeller, package freighter, Official No. 141486. Scrapped in Peru in 1960.
  (originally Canadian Sailor, later Nichiyei Maru and Nitei Maru), Canadian (later Japanese) propeller, package freighter, Official No. 141377. Foundered in the Yellow Sea on October 11, 1942.

References

Ship names